The Ceylon killifish (UDA HANDAYA / උඩ හඳයා)(Aplocheilus dayi) is a species of killifish endemic to Sri Lanka. Males and females have a black dot at the rear end of the base of the dorsal fin. The females lay 50–150 eggs. The specific name of this fish honours the Inspector-General of Fisheries in India Francis Day (1829-1889), who first reported this fish, although he identified it as Aplocheilus panchax.

References

Tropical fish
Taxa named by Franz Steindachner 
Fish described in 1892
Ceylon killifish